Falsotrachystola asidiformis is a species of beetle in the family Cerambycidae. It was described by Maurice Pic in 1915, originally under the genus Trachystola.

References

Morimopsini
Beetles described in 1915